"Koi ni Ochitara" (Japanese: 恋におちたら; English: If I Fall in Love) is a song recorded by Japanese singer Crystal Kay for her sixth studio album Call Me Miss... (2006). Written by H.U.B. and Shingo.S with production handled by Sakazume MisakIt, it was released as her 17th physical single through Sony Music Japan on May 18, 2005. The single is supported with the B-side tracks "Love It Take It" and "Bet You Don't Know (English ver.)"; the latter track was originally included as part of her previous album Crystal Style (2005).

A commercial success in Japan, "Koi ni Ochitara" peaked at number two on the Oricon Singles Chart and sold over 288,000 copies by the end of the year, making it the 30th best-selling single in the country in 2005. It was certified four times by the Recording Industry Association of Japan (RIAJ) in different categories, including double platinum for digital sales, million in chaku-uta (ringtone), and platinum in physical shipments. In 2009, the title track attained a new peak on the Billboard Japan Hot 100 of number 51.

Background and release
"Koi ni Ochitara" was used as the theme for the drama Koi ni Ochitara ~Boku no Seikou no Himitsu~, which was broadcast in Japan from April to June 2005. The single was officially released on May 18, 2005, as the lead single for Kay's sixth studio album Call Me Miss..., which was made available on February 22, 2006. The song was additionally included as part of the Best of Crystal Kay compilation album and was remixed by Genki Rockets for her remix album The Best Remixes of CK, both released in 2009. In the same year, during Crystal Kay's 10 year career project, titled "Let's Vote -Minna ga Eranda Crystal Kay no Daisuki na Kyoku-" the song was ranked second.

Music video
The music video for "Koi ni Ochitara" features Crystal singing in a public center. As she does, the video cuts to her singing in a purple and pink background.

Reception
The single is currently the best-selling single of her career, selling 295,456 copies to date and Kay has stated that it changed the focus of her career away from R&B and towards J-pop. In its first week it sold 73,717 copies, in its second week it dropped to number 4 and sold 51,546 copies, and in the third week it fell one place to number 5, selling a further 38,302 copies.

Track listing 
CD single
 "Koi ni Ochitara" (恋におちたら; If I Fall in Love) — 4:29
 "Love It Take It" — 3:27
 "Bet You Don't Know (English Version)" — 4:38
 "Koi ni Ochitara (Instrumental)" — 4:29

Credits and personnel

 Crystal Kay – vocalist , lyricist/composer 
 H.U.B. – lyricist 
 Sakazume Misako – producer 
 Shingo.S – arranger 
 Natsumi Watanabe – lyricist 
 Jamelia Davis – composer, arranger 
 Sean Hosein – composer 
 Dane Deviller – composer 
 Ashley Ingram – composer, arranger

Charts

Daily and weekly charts

Yearly charts

Sales and certifications

References 

Crystal Kay songs
2005 singles
2005 songs